Alice Jackson (born 28 December 1958) is a former American female sprinter. She has competed in few notable competitive events during her career including the 1983 Pan American Games, 1987 IAAF World Indoor Championships and 1989 IAAF World Indoor Championships.

Alice Jackson claimed gold medals in the women's 4×100m and 4×400m relay events during the 1983 Pan American Games.

References

External links 
 

1958 births
Living people
American female sprinters
American female track and field athletes
Pan American Games gold medalists for the United States
Pan American Games medalists in athletics (track and field)
Athletes (track and field) at the 1983 Pan American Games
Medalists at the 1983 Pan American Games
21st-century American women
20th-century American women